Vetepere is a village in Järva Parish, Järva County in northern-central Estonia. As of 2011 Census, the settlement's population was 27. With a comparatively large area, Vetepere comprises several bogs including Kakerdaja, Kautla, Kodru and Laeksaare bogs. Vetepere is passed by the Jägala, Ambla and Tarvasjõgi rivers.

The place was first mentioned as Karuvõhma (Corgewames) in 1507. In 1538 a manor with the same name was mentioned. In the 1570s when the owner was J. Wetberg, the place gained the name of Vetepere. In 1694 it was merged to Albu manor. In 1782 the Vetepere (Uue-Albu) cattle manor was mentioned.

One of the most notable Estonian writers A. H. Tammsaare (1878–1940), was born on one of the bog islands in Vetepere. His notable novel Truth and Justice's (part I) main location Vargamäe farm appears very similar to Tammsaare's birthplace. In 1958, a museum dedicated to Tammsaare was opened there.

In the village, there is also Simisalu observation tower and camping area. The tower is 18 metres high.

Gallery

References

External links
A.H. Tammsaare museum

Villages in Järva County
Tourist attractions in Järva County